The olive-winged bulbul (Pycnonotus plumosus) is a member of the bulbul family of passerine birds. 
It is found in south-eastern Asia and the Greater Sunda Islands. 
Its natural habitat is subtropical or tropical moist lowland forests.

Taxonomy and systematics
Until 2010, the ashy-fronted bulbul was also considered as a subspecies of the olive-winged bulbul.

Subspecies
Four subspecies are recognized:
 P. p. porphyreus - Oberholser, 1912: Found on western Sumatra and nearby islands 
 P. p. plumosus - Blyth, 1845: Found on Malay Peninsula, eastern Sumatra, Java, Bali and western and southern Borneo
 P. p. hutzi - Stresemann, 1938: Found on northern and eastern Borneo
 P. p. hachisukae - Deignan, 1952: Found on islands off northern Borneo and south-western Philippines

References

olive-winged bulbul
Birds of Malesia
olive-winged bulbul
olive-winged bulbul
Taxonomy articles created by Polbot